S M Sultan Bengal Charukala Mahabidyalay (aks SM Sultan Bengal Art College) is a fine art college in Narail, Bangladesh, which runs educational activities under the National University of Bangladesh.

Background
S M Sultan Bengal Art College (after S M Sultan Bengal Charukala Mahabidyalay) officially opened on August 10 in 2009 at Sultan complex, Shishushorgo building at the bank of river Chitra in Masimdia village, Narail, Khulna by Bengal Foundation under Bengal Education & Research Programme. It is named after Bengali avant-garde artist SM Sultan, who was awarded with the Ekushey Padak in 1982; and the Independence Day Award in 1993 for his achievement in fine arts.

It offers degrees in Bachelor of Fine Arts (BFA) and a Masters of Fine Arts (MFA).

See also
SM Sultan
National University of Bangladesh

References

External links

Educational Institutions in Bangladesh
2013 establishments in Bangladesh
Colleges affiliated to National University, Bangladesh
Educational institutions established in 2013